I Lie is the thirty-fourth solo studio album by American country music singer-songwriter Loretta Lynn.  It was released on February 1, 1982, by MCA Records.

Commercial performance
The album peaked at No. 33 on the Billboard Top Country Albums chart. The only single release, the album's title track, peaked at No. 9 on the Billboard Hot Country Songs chart and is Lynn's most recent top 10 hit.

Track listing

Personnel
Adapted from album liner notes.

Harold Bradley - guitar
Owen Bradley - producer
David Briggs - piano
James Caddell - backing vocals
Jimmy Capps - guitar
Jean Ann Chapman - backing vocals
Gene Chrisman - drums
Johnny Christopher - guitar
The Dottie Dee Singers - backing vocals
Ray Edenton - guitar
Sonny Garrish - steel guitar
Buddy Harman - drums
The Jordanaires - backing vocals
Slick Lawson - photography
Mike Leech - bass
Kenny Malone - drums
Grady Martin - guitar
Charlie McCoy - harmonica
Joe Mills - engineer
Bob Moore - bass
The Nashville Sounds - backing vocals
Hargus "Pig" Robbins - piano
Hal Rugg - steel guitar
Joel Scarbury - backing vocals
The Shelly Kurland Strings - strings
Joan Sliwin - backing vocals
Bobby Thompson - guitar
Bill Vandevort - engineer
Pete Wade - guitar
Bobby Wood - piano
Reggie Young - guitar

Chart positions
Album – Billboard (North America)

Singles - Billboard (North America)

References

1982 albums
Loretta Lynn albums
Albums produced by Owen Bradley
MCA Records albums